Acantholycosa baltoroi is a species of wolf spider found in Kashmir, Nepal and China.

There is a reddish-brown heart-shaped mark on the abdomen and pale rings on the femora.

References

Lycosidae
Spiders of Asia
Spiders described in 1935